Humm is a surname. Notable people with the surname include:

Andy Humm (born 1953), American journalist and activist
Daniel Humm (born 1976), Swiss chef and restaurant owner
David Humm (born 1952), American football player
Fabienne Humm  (born 1986), Swiss football player
Jeremy Humm (born 1983), Australian rules footballer
Philipp Humm (born 1959), German businessman